Lal Dena (born 11 January 1939) is a historian of modern South Asia with special interest in Manipur and Mizoram. He is a retired professor of Manipur University and the former Vice Chancellor of Sangai International University, Churachandpur.

Education
Prof. Lal Dena passed Class-X from Pherzawl High School in 1959, and did PUC from DM College in 1963. He did BA from Gauhati University in 1966 and MA (History) from Gauhati University in 1970; and received his Ph.D. degree from Jawaharlal Nehru University (JNU), New Delhi in 1982.

Academic career
Prof. Lal Dena taught history at the Department of History, Manipur University, Imphal, until his retirement. He then joined Sangai International University as Vice Chancellor.

Books
Lal Dena (1991), History of Modem Manipur, 1826-1949. New Delhi: Omsons (edited).
Lal Dena (1984). British Policy Towards Manipur,[1891-1919].
Lal Dena (2008).  In Search of Identity: Hmars of North East India. Akansha.
Lal Dena (1995). Hmar Folk Tales. Scholar Publishing House.

References

Historians of South Asia
20th-century Indian historians
Historians of Northeast India
Living people
Gauhati University alumni
Jawaharlal Nehru University alumni
Indigenous peoples of South Asia
1939 births